Shri Sant Gajanan Maharaj College of Engineering (SSGMCE) is an engineering college at Shegaon in Buldhana District of Maharashtra, India. It is affiliated to Sant Gadge Baba Amravati University. SSGMCE was established on 23 August 1983 by Shri Gajanan Shikshan Sanstha, Shegaon. It is run by Shri Sant Gajanan Maharaj Temple Trust. The college grants Bachelor's & Master's degrees in engineering (BE & ME) in mechanical, electronics & telecommunication, computer science and engineering, and information technology. It also offers programs of Masters in Business Administration (MBA). It had a total enrollment of around 1,600 students in the academic year of 2017–2018.

Associations
The institution is associated with the following associations:
 IEEE–Institute of Electrical & Electronics Engineers, New York City
 E-Cell–Entrepreneurship Cell Students' Chapter
 American Society of Mechanical Engineers, New York
 Association for Computing Machinery, New York
 Computer Society of India, Mumbai
 Society of Automative Engineers
 Institute of Engineers
 Indian Society for Technical Education
 Maharashtra Energy Development Agency
 Institution of Electronics and Telecommunication Engineers
 Calcutta Mathematical Society
 Indian Academy of Sciences, Bangalore
 AIMS-Associations of Indian Management Schools
 National Geographic Society
 Bombay Natural History Society, Mumbai
 ISBA

Notable alumni 
 Shivdeep Lande is an IPS Officer of 2006 batch.
Mohit Sharma (soldier) was an Indian Army Officer who was posthumously awarded the Ashoka Chakra, India's highest peace-time military decoration.

References

External links 

Engineering colleges in Maharashtra
All India Council for Technical Education
Sant Gadge Baba Amravati University
Education in Buldhana district
Educational institutions established in 1983
1983 establishments in Maharashtra